Guido Acklin (born 21 November 1969) is a Swiss bobsledder who competed in the 1990s. At the 1994 Winter Olympics in Lillehammer, he won a silver medal in the two-man event with his teammate Reto Götschi.

Acklin also won two medals in the two-man event at the FIBT World Championships with a gold in 1997 and a bronze in 1996.

References
 Bobsleigh two-man Olympic medalists 1932-56 and since 1964
 Bobsleigh two-man world championship medalists since 1931
 DatabaseOlympics.com profile

1969 births
Bobsledders at the 1994 Winter Olympics
Bobsledders at the 1998 Winter Olympics
Bobsledders at the 2002 Winter Olympics
Living people
Olympic silver medalists for Switzerland
Olympic bobsledders of Switzerland
Swiss male bobsledders
Olympic medalists in bobsleigh
Medalists at the 1994 Winter Olympics
20th-century Swiss people